Caeneressa tienmushana is a species of moth in the family Erebidae. It was described by Obraztsov in 1957. It is found in China (Zhejiang, Fujian).

References

Ctenuchina
Moths described in 1957